The Squanacook River Dam is just south of Groton Road between Groton and Shirley in Middlesex County, Massachusetts.  It is one of five dams on the Squannacook River, which forms the boundary between Groton and Shirley.

Dams in Massachusetts
Buildings and structures in Middlesex County, Massachusetts